A&A Bake & Doubles and Roti Shop is a Caribbean restaurant owned by Trinidadian immigrants Noel and Geeta Brown, located on Fulton Street in Bedford-Stuyvesant, Brooklyn. It is known for its doubles (curried chickpea sandwiches on fried flatbread), bake, roti, and other dishes. 

It was originally located on Nostrand Avenue at Macon Street, and moved to Fulton Street due to a dramatic increase in business, which has been in part attributed to the effects of gentrification in Bedford-Stuyvesant.

Recognition
The shop was reviewed by ex-Village Voice food critic Robert Sietsema in 2018 and became among five winners of the James Beard Foundation's American Classics Award in 2019.

References

External links
 Official website

Restaurants in Brooklyn
Bedford-Stuyvesant
James Beard Foundation Award winners
History of immigration to the United States
Caribbean-American culture in New York City